Crossomeles aureopilis is a species of beetle in the family Cerambycidae. It was described by Fisher in 1953.

References

Rhinotragini
Beetles described in 1953